Pauls Jonass (born 13 January 1997, in Kalvene, Kalvene Parish, South Kurzeme Municipality) is a Latvian professional motocross racer. In 2017, he won the MX2 World Championship with 6 GP wins.

Achievements
As of 11 August 2021, Jonass has won 11 GPs in the Motocross World Championship.

References

External links
 

Living people
1997 births
Latvian motocross riders